Kuu.. is the fourth full-length album by Russian post-rock band Kauan, released on Avantgarde Music in 2011.

Track listing
"Tähtien hiljainen laulu" - 14:57
"Kauniin kuun sävelen" - 07:34
"Ikuinen junan kulku" - 10:35
"Suora liila sydänkäyrä" - 11:45

Personnel
Anton Belov - guitar, vocals, keyboards, programming
Lubov Mushnikova – violin

References

2011 albums
Kauan albums